The Ambidravi (Gaulish: *Ambidrauoi, 'those around the Dravus') were a Gallic tribe dwelling around the upper Drava river, near Teurnia (Switzerland), during the Roman period.

Name 
They are mentioned as Ambídranoi (Ἀμβίδρανοι) by Ptolemy (2nd c. AD), and as Ambidr(avi) and [A]mbidr(avi) on inscriptions.

The ethnic name Ambidravi is a latinized form of the Gaulish *Ambridauoi, which means 'around the Dravus', that is 'those living around the Dravus river'.

Geography 
The Ambidravi lived around the upper Dravas river (modern Drava), near the city of Teurnia. Their territory was located north of the Ambilici, east of the Laianci.

References

Bibliography 

Historical Celtic peoples
Gauls